Geyeria uruguayana is a moth in the Castniidae family. It is found in Uruguay, Argentina and southern Brazil.

The larvae have been recorded feeding on Eryngium paniculatum.

References

Moths described in 1879
Castniidae